Jean Robert Beaulé (June 17, 1927 – January 9, 2005) was a Canadian politician, electrician, insurance broker and railway employee. He was elected to the House of Commons of Canada in the 1962 federal election as a Member of the Social Credit Party to represent the riding of Quebec East. He was re-elected in the 1963 election and resigned from the party with other Quebec Social credit MPs to form the Ralliement Créditiste. He was defeated in the 1965 election. He died in 2005 in Quebec City.

References

External links
 

1927 births
Members of the House of Commons of Canada from Quebec
Politicians from Greater Sudbury
Politicians from Quebec City
Social Credit Party of Canada MPs
Franco-Ontarian people
2005 deaths